Ndoola (Ndoro) or Njoyamɛ in Cameroon is a Bantoid language of Nigeria, with several thousand speakers in Cameroon. It is either among or related to the Mambiloid languages.

References 

Mambiloid languages
Languages of Nigeria
Languages of Cameroon